Payena lamii is a tree in the family Sapotaceae. Inflorescences bear up to 10 flowers. The tree is named for the Dutch botanist Herman Johannes Lam. Its habitat is swamp and kerangas forests from sea level to  altitude. P. lamii is endemic to Borneo and known only from Sarawak.

References

lamii
Endemic flora of Borneo
Trees of Borneo
Flora of Sarawak
Plants described in 1958